Érick Germáin Aguirre Tafolla  (born 23 February 1997) is a Mexican professional footballer who plays as a left-back for Liga MX club Monterrey.

Club career

Morelia
Aguirre made his senior debut with Morelia on 8 August 2014, in a 0–0 goalless draw. He would score his first goal with the team on 19 September 2014 in a 3–2 loss against Pumas UNAM.

Pachuca
On 8 June 2016, it was declared that Aguirre was purchased by Pachuca. He would score his first goal with the team on 20 January 2018 against Lobos BUAP, adding the third tally where Pachuca won 3–1.

Monterrey
On 3 July 2021, Aguirre joined Monterrey.

International career

Youth
Aguirre participated in the 2013 CONCACAF U-17 Championship in Panama. With Mexico winning the tournament, the team would go on to qualify to the 2013 FIFA U-17 World Cup. Aguirre would also go on to participated in the U-17 World Cup. During the final against Nigeria, he would score an own goal at the 9th minute as Mexico would go on to lose 3–0.

Aguirre was called up by Sergio Almaguer to participate in the 2015 CONCACAF U-20 Championship in Jamaica. Mexico would go on winning the tournament. Aguirre was then called up to participate in the 2015 FIFA U-20 World Cup with Mexico in New Zealand, where he would appear in all three group stage matches but Mexico would finish last in the group.

On 18 September 2015, Aguirre was selected by coach Raúl Gutierrez to play in the 2015 CONCACAF Olympic Qualifying Championship. Mexico would go onto the final, winning 2–0 over Honduras.

On 7 July 2016, Aguirre was named in Mexico's 18-man squad that would participate in the 2016 Summer Olympics in Rio de Janeiro, Brazil. He would only appear in two group stage matches as Mexico would be eliminated in the group stage.

In May 2019, he was called up by Jaime Lozano to participate in that year's Toulon Tournament. He would go on to appear in all matches as Mexico won third place in the competition.

He also participated at the 2020 CONCACAF Olympic Qualifying Championship, appearing as squad captain, where Mexico won the competition. He was subsequently called up to participate in the 2020 Summer Olympics. Aguirre won the bronze medal with the Olympic team.

Senior
Mexico interim manager, Ricardo Ferretti, called up Aguirre for the first time for September friendlies against Uruguay and the United States. He would make his debut with the senior national team on 11 September 2018 in a friendly match against the United States, losing 1–0.

Career statistics

Club

International

Style of play
Capable of playing as a holding midfielder or as a full-back, he has been described as  able "to see the game in slow motion," innately possessing a perception of space of the players around him, and the vision to distribute passes.

He was listed in The Guardian's list of Next Generation 2014: 40 of the best young talents in world football.

Honours
Morelia
Supercopa MX: 2014

Pachuca
CONCACAF Champions League: 2016–17

Monterrey
CONCACAF Champions League: 2021

Mexico Youth
CONCACAF U-17 Championship: 2013
FIFA U-17 World Cup runner-up: 2013
CONCACAF U-20 Championship: 2015
CONCACAF Olympic Qualifying Championship: 2015, 2020
Olympic Bronze Medal: 2020

Individual
CONCACAF Olympic Qualifying Championship Best XI: 2015

References

External links
 
 
 
 

1997 births
Living people
People from Uruapan
Footballers from Michoacán
Mexican footballers
Association football fullbacks
Mexico youth international footballers
Mexico under-20 international footballers
2015 CONCACAF U-20 Championship players
Footballers at the 2016 Summer Olympics
Footballers at the 2020 Summer Olympics
Olympic footballers of Mexico
Mexico international footballers
Atlético Morelia players
C.F. Pachuca players
Liga MX players
Olympic medalists in football
Olympic bronze medalists for Mexico
Medalists at the 2020 Summer Olympics